The  FS E.625 and E.626 are two classes of Italian electric locomotives produced for the Ferrovie dello Stato. They were introduced in the course of the 1920s and remained in service until the 1990s. The E.626 was the first locomotive fed by 3,000 V DC overhead line in Italy.

History
The E.626 class is the result of a requirement issued in 1926 by the Ferrovie dello Stato (FS, Italian Railways) for a new locomotive to be used under the new 3,000 V DC line being built between Foggia and Benevento. The design was carried out by the team of Giuseppe Bianchi, the "founder" of modern Italian railways, at the FS Traction and Material Service in Florence. The requirement specified the locomotive should have six traction axles, to improve adhesion on steep lines. The E.626 series totalled 448 units in three series, each with only slight electro-mechanical differences. It was old-fashioned, but reliable, and it became the mainstay of the new FS lines at 3,000 V DC, which gradually spread to the whole peninsula.

Trials
The firsts tests occurred on the Foggia-Benevento line in the September 1927, using three prototypes built by Savigliano, with the electrical equipment provided by Metropolitan-Vickers of Manchester. The first 14 prototypes (eight E.625 with lower gear ratio, for freight services, and six E.626) proved powerful and reliable, and entered service the following year. The only teething problem encountered was with the six 32R motors mounted on the axles, hanging laterally over transverse beams, a system devised to avoid the complicated side rods of the contemporary steam and three-phase locomotives. Traction control was provided by three different motor combinations (series, series-parallel, parallel) through banks of resistor-based rheostats. The transmission was rather noisy, but at the time, the crew's comfort was not a high priority. The carbody was in a single steel piece, mounted on an articulated chassis. The large bonnets at the ends limited the visibility of the rails, and they were reduced in size from the third series.

Mass production

In 1930 the mass production was started, with a first series of 85 units. In the meantime the E.625 were re-converted to E.626. In 1934-1938 a record number of 308 units was built, while in 1939 the last series, with low gear ratio, was shipped (they were later standardized). The new E636 of the 1940s initially shared the motors and some of the electro-mechanical devices with the E.626.

After the destruction of World War II, in 1946 an updating and repair programme was launched. Some other units remained in the countries previously occupied by Italy. Seventeen locomotives were ceded to the Yugoslavian Railways (Class E626, from 1957 Class E61 and from 1962 finally classified as Class 361) and, in 1958, four were given to Czechoslovakia (Class E 666.0). Now inadequate for the passenger role, the E.626s were transferred to freight service, apart from working commuter trains in some areas of Italy.

In the 1970s, the E.626s fell out of favour, partly because of complaints from trade unions about poor working conditions for the crew. Fourteen units were sold to private railways and the remaining units were gradually replaced by more modern classes, and scrapped. The last unit to be decommissioned was E.626.194, which was used for rescue trains, in 1999.

Preservation
Seven units survive today in museums, while 11 refurbished locomotives are used for historical trains.

Notes

References

Further reading

    Giuseppe Bianchi, Sebastiano Elena, I locomotori a corrente continua a 3000 volt gruppi E.625 ed E.626, in Rivista tecnica delle ferrovie italiane, (1930), n. 5, pp. 189–250, (1930), n. 5, pp. 13–55 e tavv.
    Felice Corini, Trazione elettrica, Torino, UTET, 1931, v. 4, pp. 432–433
    Giuseppe Bianchi, La unificazione delle locomotive a corrente continua a 3000 volt. Locomotive gruppo E.424 - E.326 - E.626 - E.428 e Automotrici gruppo E.24, in Rivista tecnica delle ferrovie italiane, a. 23, 45 (1934), n. 4, pp. 187–203 e tavv. IX-XII; n. 5, pp. 256–329 e tavv. XIII f. t.; n. 6, pp. 410–417.
    Giuseppe Bianchi, Sebastiano Elena, Le locomotive elettriche a corrente continua a 3000 volt gruppo E.626, in Rivista tecnica delle ferrovie italiane, a. , 48 (1935), n. 6, pp. , a. , 49 (1936), n. 1, pp. e tavv.
    Felice Corini, Trazione elettrica, Torino, UTET, 1950, v. 2, pp. 193–260, 335-407, 532-533 e tavv.
    Erminio Mascherpa, Le locomotive elettriche F.S. del gr. E.626. Primi passi delle continua a 3000 volt in Italia, in Italmodel ferrovie, (1969), n. 147, pp. 4778–4785, n. 148, pp. 4829–4837, (1970) n. 149, pp. 4883–4886
    Claudio Pedrazzini, E.625-E.626, Parma, Ermanno Albertelli, 1981
    Giovanni Cornolò, Locomotive elettriche FS, Parma, Ermanno Albertelli Editore, 1983, pp. 151–163.
    Tiziano Croce, E 626, le locomotive "tuttofare", fascicolo fuori testo Locomotive elettriche in Tutto treno, 5 (1992), n. 40, pp. 1–8
    Giovanni Cornolò, Dall'E.626 all'Eurostar. 1928-2008: ottant'anni di locomotive elettriche FS, Parma, Ermanno Albertelli, 2008,  pp. 101–142

E.626
Bo′BoBo′ locomotives
Bo-Bo-Bo locomotives
3000 V DC locomotives
Railway locomotives introduced in 1928
Standard gauge locomotives of Italy
CEMSA locomotives